Johl Cameron Powell (born 6 June 2001) is an English footballer who plays as a midfielder for Dulwich Hamlet.

Career

Charlton Athletic
He made his debut for Charlton Athletic on 10 November 2020 in a 3–1 EFL Trophy victory over Leyton Orient.

On 23 May 2022, it was announced that Powell was leaving Charlton Athletic at the end of his contract.

Maidstone United (loan)
On 22 February 2022, Powell joined Maidstone United on an initial month's loan.

Dulwich Hamlet

Following his release from Charlton Athletic Powell joined Dulwich Hamlet on 21 November 2022, making his debut off the bench in a 4-3 win against Cray Wanderers in the London Senior Cup on 30 November 2022 and scoring his first goal for the club in a 2-0 win against Weymouth in the National League South on 20 December 2022.

Personal life
He is a supporter of Charlton Athletic.

Career statistics

Honours 
Maidstone United

 National League South: 2021–22

References

External links
 

2000 births
Living people
English footballers
Association football midfielders
Charlton Athletic F.C. players
Maidstone United F.C. players 
Dulwich Hamlet F.C. players